also known as Konchiin Sūden, was a Zen Rinzai monk and advisor to Tokugawa Ieyasu, and later to Tokugawa Hidetada and Iemitsu on religious matters and foreign affairs. He played a significant role in the initial development of the Tokugawa shogunate.

Life
Sūden oversaw the administration of Shinto shrines and Buddhist temples in the country alongside Itakura Katsushige, and was involved in a great many diplomatic affairs along with advisors Hayashi Razan and Honda Masazumi. Sūden made his home at the Konchi-in temple he founded in Sunpu, and founded another one by the same name in Edo in 1618.  He was abbot of Nanzen-ji in Kyoto.

Sūden played an important role in negotiations with the Chinese Ming court over the reopening of trade and the problem of piracy. Sūden was also involved in communications with the Spanish authorities in Manila and with the Kingdom of Siam.  He was instrumental in organizing and receiving Korean embassies to Japan. He drafted a great many communications during this period, some of the more notable ones being rejections of the notion that the shōgun should be referred to as a "king", as this would imply subordination to the Emperor of China and tributary status within the Sinocentric world order.

Among his other works was the draft in 1615 of the Buke shohatto, which he then read at an assembly of daimyō at Fushimi, and the draft of the edict banning Christianity in the previous year. In 1616, he oversaw the funeral services for Tokugawa Ieyasu, along with priests Tenkai and Bonshun.

Sūden compiled all the diplomatic records of his period of service into the Ikoku nikki (Chronicle of Foreign Countries).  He authored the Honkō kokushi nikki (Chronicles of Master Honkō), both of which remain valuable primary sources on the nature of diplomacy of the time, and on specific events.

Selected works 
 影印本異国日記: 金地院崇伝外交文書集成 (Eiinbon Ikoku nikki: Konchiin Sūden gaikō monjo shūsei; Register of Foreign Affairs). Tokyo: Tokyo Bijutsu. ; 
 新訂本光國師日記 (Shintei Honkō kokushi nikki (Chronicles of Master Honkō). Tokyo: Zoku Gunsho Ruijū Kanseikai.

Notes

References 
 Nussbaum, Louis Frédéric and Käthe Roth. (2005). Japan Encyclopedia. Cambridge: Harvard University Press. ; 
 Toby, Ronald. (1984). State and Diplomacy in Early Modern Japan. Princeton: Princeton University Press. ; 

Rinzai Buddhists
Japanese diplomats
1569 births
1633 deaths
Edo period Buddhist clergy
Japanese diarists